The Billings Memorial Library is located on the campus of the University of Vermont in Burlington.  Built in 1883, it was designed by American architect Henry Hobson Richardson to resemble the Winn Library in Woburn, Massachusetts, United States.

History

The library was given to the University of Vermont by Frederick H. Billings, of Woodstock.  It has been a central part of campus life since opening in 1885, and despite the University's growth over the intervening century, the fact that it has remained so close to its original appearance is a testament to the strength and power of its architecture.

A new library, the Guy W. Bailey Library (now known as the Howe Library), was built for the University of Vermont in 1961 due to lack of space at Billings Library. The Billings Library was then converted to a student center in 1963. After the building was determined to have been outgrown for student center purposes, the Dudley H. Davis Center was built and completed in 2007 to be the university's new student center.

Thanks to an $11.4 million renovation completed in the summer of 2018, UVM's most architecturally important building once again houses academic departments, including Special Collections, the Miller Center for Holocaust Studies, the Humanities Center, and the Center for Research on Vermont.

Gallery

Related
 Frederick H. Billings
 University of Vermont
 Woodstock, Vermont

References

External links
 

Richardsonian Romanesque architecture in Vermont
Henry Hobson Richardson buildings
Buildings at the University of Vermont
Library buildings completed in 1883
Libraries in Vermont
1883 establishments in Vermont